Merricks North is a rural locality on the Mornington Peninsula in Melbourne, Victoria, Australia, approximately  south-east of Melbourne's Central Business District, located within the Shire of Mornington Peninsula local government area. Merricks North recorded a population of 423 at the 2021 census.

Merricks North is located in the southern extremity of the Mornington Peninsula.

See also
 Shire of Hastings – Merricks North was previously within this former local government area.

References

Towns in Victoria (Australia)
Mornington Peninsula
Western Port